Markea is a genus of plant in family Solanaceae. It contains the following species (but this list may be incomplete):
 Markea epifita S.Knapp
 Markea fosbergii Hunz.
 Markea spruceana Hunz.

 
Solanaceae genera
Taxonomy articles created by Polbot